Carlson is a locality situated north of Tabor Lake, British Columbia. It is considered a part of greater Prince George.

References

Localities in the Regional District of Fraser-Fort George